Two-time defending champions Diede de Groot and Aniek van Koot defeated Yui Kamiji and Zhu Zhenzhen in the final, 6–3, 6–2 to win the women's doubles wheelchair tennis title at the 2023 Australian Open.

Seeds

Draw

Finals

References

External links 
 Draw

Wheelchair women's doubles
Australian Open, 2023 women's doubles